was an aircraft manufacturer in the Empire of Japan, specializing primarily in aircraft for the Imperial Japanese Army Air Force. It was based at Tachikawa, in Tokyo Prefecture.

History

Tachikawa Aircraft

In 1936, the Imperial Japanese Army acquired a controlling interest in the company, and renamed it the Tachikawa Aircraft Company Ltd. The company manufactured a number of types, mostly training aircraft and fighters for the Imperial Japanese Army.  Some were its own designs placed into full production, such as the Ki-9 and Ki-36. A number of others were either short-run specials,  or prototypes that did not enter production, such as the Ki-77.

In 1940, the company received license-production rights to the Lockheed Model 14 Super Electra which it produced as the Army Type LO transport. Tachikawa also produced aircraft designed by other Japanese manufacturers.

As with all Japanese manufacturers, production of all types ceased after the surrender of Japan to Allied forces in August 1945. The facilities of Tachikawa Aircraft had been severely damaged by bombing during the war, and most of its property, including its airfield, were seized by the American military and become part of the Tachikawa Air Base. Many of its engineers went to work for Nissan and Toyota, helping develop the technologies of the Japanese automobile industry. The Prince Motor Company (later acquired by Nissan) was a direct spin-out from the former Tachikawa Aircraft Company.

New Tachikawa Aircraft Company 
During the occupation of Japan after the end of World War II, all of Japan's aerospace industry was dismantled, designs destroyed and plants converted to other uses.

Shin Tachikawa built prototype training aircraft, the R-52 and R-53 in the early 1950s. The R-52 was the first post-war, all-Japanese aircraft constructed. However, neither aircraft were commercially successful and the company survived by making precision components for aircraft, and for non-aircraft related industries. Since 1976, after the return of a large amount of land occupied by the United States Air Force since the end of World War II, the company turned towards real estate development, consumer electronics, and the production of automotive parts.

Ishikawajima Aircraft
 Ishikawajima T-2 - 1927 prototype reconnaissance aircraft. Two built.
 Ishikawajima CM-1 (later Ishikawajima R-1) - 1927 basic trainer with wooden structure. One built.
 Ishikawajima R-2 - 1927 basic trainer with all metal structure. Two  built.
 Ishikawajima T-3 - 1928 prototype reconnaissance aircraft. One built.
 Ishikawajima R-3 - 1929 basic trainer. Five built.
 Ishikawajima R-5 - 1933 basic trainer. Two built.

Tachikawa Aircraft

 Ki-9 - 'Spruce' 1930 biplane intermediate trainer 
 KKY - Light ambulance aircraft - 23 built.
 KS - Survey aircraft for Japanese Government Railways - based on KKY. Two built 1939.
 Ki-17 - 'Cedar' 1935 biplane basic trainer
 Ki-24 - DFS SG 38 built under license
 Ki-25 - 1937 prototype glider based on the Göppingen Gö 3
 Ki-26 - 1936 prototype training glider
 Ki-29 - 1936 prototype light bomber; lost to the Mitsubishi Ki-30
 Ki-36 - 'Ida' 1938 Army co-operation aircraft
 Ki-54 - 'Hickory' 1940 twin-engine advanced monoplane trainer
 Ki-55 - 'Ida' 1940 single-engine advanced trainer
 Ki-70 - 'Clara' 1943 prototype high-speed photo reconnaissance aircraft
 Ki-72 - Re-engined version of Ki-55 with retractable landing gear, not built
 Ki-74 - 'Pat'/'Patsy' 1944 prototype high-altitude reconnaissance bomber
 Ki-77 - 1942 experimental twin-engine long-range transport/communications aircraft
 Ki-92 - experimental twin-engine long-range transport aircraft
 Ki-94 - prototype high-altitude fighter-interceptor
 Ki-104 - attack version of Ki-94, not built
 Ki-110 - wooden prototype of Ki-54
 Ki-111 - fuel tanker project
 Ki-114 - projected wooden fuel tanker
 T.S. 1 - Light trainer
 R-38 - Parasol-winged civil trainer. Two built.
 Type LO Transport Aircraft - Lockheed Model 14 Super Electra built under license

Shin Tachikawa Aircraft
 Tachihi R-52 - civilian training aircraft 
 Tachihi R-53 - civilian training aircraft
 Tachihi R-MH-310 - civilian training aircraft

See also 
 Mechanical Engineering Heritage (Japan), No. 40: Electric vehicle TAMA
Tatsuo Hasegawa
Jiro Tanaka
Air raids on Japan#Destruction of Japan's main cities

References

External links

 TACHIHI Holdings Co., Ltd. website (In Japanese)

 
Defunct aircraft manufacturers of Japan
Defunct defense companies of Japan
Empire of Japan
Imperial Japanese Army
Auto parts suppliers of Japan
Electronics companies of Japan
Technology companies of Japan
Manufacturing companies established in 1924
Manufacturing companies disestablished in 1955
Japanese companies established in 1924
1955 disestablishments in Japan
Postwar Japan